David Clement Makinson (born 27 August 1941), is an Australian mathematical logician living in London, England.

Career 
Makinson began his studies at Sydney University in 1958 and was an associate of the Libertarian Society and Sydney Push. He is a Visiting Professor in the London School of Economics, University of London, and an associate member of the Centre de Recherche en Epistémologie Appliquée (CREA), École Polytechnique, Paris. He has held professorial rank positions in King's College London, University of London and in the American University of Beirut, Lebanon. From 1980 till 2001 he worked for UNESCO, Paris.

Contributions 
David Makinson is highly regarded for his work on belief revision, uncertain reasoning, and modal logic. While studying in Oxford University (Worcester College) for his D.Phil under the supervision of Michael Dummett, he identified the preface paradox. In belief revision he created the AGM account of theory change with Carlos Alchourrón and Peter Gärdenfors. In modal logic and other non-classical logics, he showed how to establish completeness results by adapting the method of maximal consistent set. In 1969 Makinson discovered the first simple and natural propositional logic lacking the finite model property. Together with Leon van der Torre he developed input/output logic.

External links 
 David Makinson's website
 CREA ,  École Polytechnique, Paris

Australian logicians
Academics of King's College London
Australian scientists
Australian libertarians
Belief revision
1941 births
Living people
People educated at North Sydney Boys High School
Australian philosophers
British libertarians